Ludwig Wilhelm, Prince of Bentheim and Steinfurt (1 August 181228 September 1890) was a Royal Hanoverian and Prussian Lieutenant General and the Prince of Bentheim and Steinfurt from 3 November 1866 to 28 September 1890.

Early life
Ludwig Wilhelm was born in Burgsteinfurt, Electorate of Hanover on 1 August 1812 and was the eldest son and child of Alexius, Prince of Bentheim and Steinfurt (1781–1866) and his wife Princess Wilhelmine of Solms-Braunfels (1793–1865). Ludwig Wilhelm was an elder brother of Prince Wilhelm Ferdinand of Bentheim and Steinfurt (1814–1849), Prince Julius Arnold of Bentheim and Steinfurt (1815–1857), Prince Karl Everwin of Bentheim and Steinfurt (1816–1854), Princess Augusta Juliana of Bentheim and Steinfurt (1817–1880), and Prince Ferdinand Otto of Bentheim and Steinfurt (1819–1889).

Military career
From 1844, Ludwig Wilhelm was made Rittmeister à la suite of the Royal Hanoverian Regiments Garde du Corps and rose to major in 1849. In 1855, Ludwig Wilhelm was made lieutenant colonel, colonel in 1859, major general in 1862, and lieutenant general in 1879.

Political career
In 1866, Ludwig Wilhelm succeeded his father as head of the Princely House of Bentheim and Steinfurt. As such, he became a hereditary member of the Prussian House of Lords and the First Chamber of the Diet of the Kingdom of Hanover. Following Hanover's annexation by Prussia, Ludwig Wilhelm served as a member of Westphalian Provincial Council.

Beginning in 1875, Ludwig Wilhelm became a member of the Württembergian Chamber of Lords. He inherited the seat from his childless uncle Prince Ferdinand of Solms-Braunfels who died in 1873. After 1884, Ludwig Wilhelm was represented at the Württembergian Chamber of Lords in Stuttgart by his son, Alexis.

Marriage and issue
Ludwig Wilhelm married Landgravine Bertha of Hesse-Philippsthal-Barchfeld, eldest child and daughter of Charles, Landgrave of Hesse-Philippsthal-Barchfeld and his first wife Princess Augusta of Hohenlohe-Ingelfingen, on 27 June 1839 at Schloss Barchfeld, Barchfeld. Ludwig Wilhelm and Bertha had six children:

Princess Adelheid of Bentheim and Steinfurt (17 May 1840 – 31 January 1880)
 ∞ 1879 Prince William of Hesse-Philippsthal-Barchfeld (1831–1890)
Princess Juliane of Bentheim and Steinfurt (5 January 1842 – 29 April 1878)
 ∞ 1873 Prince William of Hesse-Philippsthal-Barchfeld (1831–1890)
Princess Marie of Bentheim and Steinfurt (26 October 1843 – 22 January 1931)
 ∞ 1867 Ludwig, Prince of Sayn-Wittgenstein-Hohenstein (1831–1912)
Alexis, Prince of Bentheim and Steinfurt (17 November 1845 – 21 January 1919)
 ∞ 1881 Princess Pauline of Waldeck and Pyrmont (1855–1925)
Prince Karl of Bentheim and Steinfurt (21 February 1848 – 30 March 1854)
Prince Georg of Bentheim and Steinfurt (28 June 1851 – 28 April 1939)
 ∞ 1889 Gertrud Porth (1866–1942), created Freifrau von Althaus by Ernest II, Duke of Saxe-Coburg and Gotha

Honours and awards
He received the following orders and decorations:

Ancestry

References

Literature 
 Frank Raberg: Biographisches Handbuch der württembergischen Landtagsabgeordneten 1815–1933. Kohlhammer Verlag, Stuttgart 2001

External links
Kurzbiographie der Staatsbibliothek Berlin

1812 births
1890 deaths
People from Steinfurt
House of Bentheim and Steinfurt
People from the Electorate of Hanover
Members of the Württembergian Chamber of Lords
Members of the Prussian House of Lords
Members of the First Chamber of the Diet of the Kingdom of Hanover
Lieutenant generals of Prussia
Princes of Bentheim and Steinfurt
Grand Crosses of the Order of the Dannebrog
Military personnel from North Rhine-Westphalia